Durham Wildlife Trust, is a registered charity and was established in 1971, originally as the Durham County Conservation Trust, becoming Durham Wildlife Trust in 1988. The Trust operates across the area of the old County Durham, which today includes Darlington, Gateshead, South Tyneside and Sunderland. 

Durham Wildlife Trust is part of the federation of 46 charities across the U.K. that together form the Wildlife Trusts. Recognised by their badger logo, each individual Wildlife Trust is an independent organisation conserving wildlife in its local area. The Trusts are membership organisations with a strong volunteering tradition. Each Trust was originally founded by dedicated volunteers with a passion to conserve their local wildlife. Acting locally and making a difference nationally

Durham Wildlife Trust manages 50 nature reserves between the Tees and the Tyne. From ancient woodland and heathland to meadows, wetlands and more, the Trust has saved some of the North East’s most special places from destruction.

Today Durham Wildlife Trust continues to acquire new reserves and run large scale conservation projects, helping nature to recover across the landscape and bringing wildlife into the heart of our towns and cities.

Projects 
Durham Wildlife Trust leads and partners on numerous projects across the local area. The Trust is currently involved in projects to protect species such as the great crested newt, the water vole and the barn owl, and played an important part in helping to re-establish otters across the county's river catchments.

Heart of Durham 
The Heart of Durham is a partnership project with Durham Wildlife Trust and Northumbrian Water Limited. Based around the fringe of the North Pennines, stretching from Derwent Reservoir in the north to Hamsterley Forest in the south, the Heart of Durham Project works to restore and recreate areas of habitat over a period of many years, with the cumulative effect of restoring landscapes where wildlife can thrive on a landscape scale.

Nextdoor Nature 
The Nextdoor Nature initiative is a national lottery funded project to be delivered by Wildlife Trusts across the country and will leave a natural legacy from the Queen's Jubilee. Nextdoor Nature aims to create a huge network of community-led rewilding projects across the nation – all part of the total £22m of Lottery investment to mark the Jubilee and improve the lives of people from disadvantaged areas across the UK.

Durham Wildlife Trust, through Nextdoor Nature is supporting community groups and schools across Sunderland, South Tyneside, East Durham, and Darlington, encouraging them to work with the wider community to bring wildlife back and make a difference for nature close to where they live.

Discover Brightwater 
The Discover Brightwater Landscape Project is a National Lottery Heritage Fund supported project that aims to reveal, restore and celebrate the heritage of the Brightwater area. Durham Wildlife Trust are the programme leaders for this Landscape Partnership which involves 19 different project streams including river habitat improvements, wetland creation, heritage and archaeology involving local communities around the River Skerne catchment from the Trimdons to Darlington in the south and Shildon in the west. The project will run from the beginning of 2018 to the end of 2023, by which time almost £3m will have been invested in our heritage.

Healing Nature 
The Healing Nature Project ran from January 2021 until March 2022 and was a Green Recovery Challenge Fund project, funded by the Department for Environment, Food & Rural Affairs (DEFRA), and our partners at Gateshead Council, South Tyneside Council, and Sunderland Council. 

The project undertook habitat work for wildlife conservation and engaged people and communities with their local area and greenspaces across 20 sites spread across Gateshead, Sunderland and South Tyneside. Public events were attended by over 845 people on project sites and over 531 children from over 29 schools engaged with nature through Healing Nature. A catalogue of habitat management was performed including 47.4 hectares of grassland management, 650m of hedgerow planted, 1.15 hectares of native broadleaf woodland planted and 14,000 wildflower bulbs planted to name a few achievements.

Activities

Durham Biodiversity Partnership 
The Durham Biodiversity Partnership, which covers the same geographic area as Durham Wildlife Trust, was established in 1996 to oversee the development, implementation and monitoring of the Durham Biodiversity Action Plan (BAP), which is the medium through which the United Kingdom Biodiversity Action Plan is translated into action within the county of Durham. Members of the Partnership include a wide range of organisations and individuals who have an interest in the BAP.

Durham Wildlife Trust plays an important role in the Partnership. It provides a home for the Partnership at Rainton Meadows, and is represented on the Partnership's steering group, alongside representatives from Natural England, the Environment Agency, the Forestry Commission, Northumbrian Water, the Farming and Wildlife Advisory Group, the North East Biodiversity Forum, and the County, City and Borough Councils within the area. The Trust also operates, on behalf of the Partnership, the Durham Biodiversity Data Service, which provides high-quality species and habitat data.

Durham Wildlife Services Ltd 
Durham Wildlife Services is the Trust's commercial arm, providing an ecological consultancy service to businesses and local authorities. Although its customer base is primarily within Durham, it operates across the whole of the United Kingdom. A particular speciality is the preparation of "environmental stewardship" plans, under which farmers are able to obtain funding for properly managed conservation schemes on their land.

Profits generated by DWS are covenanted to Durham Wildlife Trust.

Education 
Education is an important aspect of the Trust's work. The main education centre is at Rainton Meadows, near Houghton-le-Spring; as well as being conveniently close to the most populous parts of the county, in Sunderland, Gateshead and South Tyneside, this centre has an indoor classroom and conference centre. At Low Barns, near Bishop Auckland, there is a second education centre, which caters primarily to outdoor activities. 

In addition to educational facilities at its own sites, the Trust also has an educational outreach programme, under which Trust staff make visits schools or community groups.

Nature reserves

Nature Reserves managed by the Trust include Bishop Middleham Quarry, Hawthorn Dene and Low Barns, and include a range of important habitats, such as Magnesian Limestone grasslands, upland hay meadows and coastal denes. The magnesian limestone grasslands managed by the Trust represent some of the finest examples of this particular habitat type, of which only 200 ha remain in the UK.

The Trust's largest reserve is Hedleyhope Fell, near Tow Law at over 200 ha. It is one of the finest examples of recovering mid-altitude heathland in the county – a rare habitat in County Durham. The site is very important because it supports a range of rare and uncommon flora and fauna, including lesser skullcap, stag's-horn clubmoss and the velvet ant, which has not been recorded anywhere else in the County. It is also home to a large number of breeding birds and is an important site for the green hairstreak butterfly.

Sites
The Trust currently manages the following reserves:

Notes

 Durham Wildlife Trust has listed information on habitats and access on each of its reserves on its website.
 Grid references use the British national grid reference system (OSGB36), the system used on Ordnance Survey maps. The grid reference for each reserve relates to the approximate centre of the reserve.

References

External links

Low Barns Volunteer Website

1971 establishments in England
 
Charities based in County Durham
Organizations established in 1971
Wildlife Trusts of England